Caloptilia schisandrae is a moth of the family Gracillariidae. It is known from China (Zhejiang), Japan (Hokkaidō and Honshū), Korea and the Russian Far East.

The wingspan is 14.5-15.5 mm.

The larvae feed on Schisandra chinensis. They probably mine the leaves of their host plant.

References

schisandrae
Moths of Asia
Moths described in 1966